Cathcart Anthony Muir West (1910–1988), who wrote under the name of Anthony C. West, was an Irish writer of novels, short stories, poems, and essays.

The fifth child in a Protestant family, West was brought up in County Down and County Cavan. He served in the Royal Air Force during World War II. After periods living in the United States, Canada, and England, he married an English woman, Olive, and settled with his family in Anglesey. He died in London in 1988.

Works
 The Native Moment (New York, 1959)
 River's End and other stories (New York, 1959)
 Rebel to Judgment (New York, 1962)
 The Ferret Fancier (New York, 1963)
 As Towns with Fire (London, 1968)
 All the King's Horses and other stories (Dublin, 1981)

Further reading
 Audrey Stockin Eyler: The writing life of Anthony C. West, Poulsbo, WA : Kitsap Publishing, [2019],

References

Eyler, Audrey Stockin, STAYING WEST, The Writing Life of Anthony C. West (Poulsbo, Washington: Kitsap Publishing), 2019;
, CELTIC, CHRISTIAN, SOCIALIST, The Novels of Anthony C. West (Rutherford, New Jersey: Fairleigh Dickinson University Press), 1993;
Foster, John Wilson, FORCES AND THEMES IN ULSTER FICTION (Totowa, New Jersey: Rowman & Littlefield), 1974; 
O'Brien, George, THE IRISH NOVEL 1960-2010 (Cork: Cork University Press), 2012

Irish writers
1988 deaths
1910 births